FIEC may refer to:

 Fellowship of Independent Evangelical Churches, an organisation linking independent, evangelical churches in the United Kingdom
 Fellowship of Independent Evangelical Churches (Australia)
 Fox Island Electric Cooperative, a utility cooperative in Vinalhaven, Maine
 European Construction Industry Federation, see Associazione Nazionale Costruttori Edili
 International Federation of Associations of Classical Studies